Radius is a London music ensemble founded in 2007 by the British composer Tim Benjamin. The ensemble specialises in the performance of new music from around the world (though primarily in the Western classical music tradition) written by living composers and 20th-century masters. The ensemble's artistic director is the British composer Ian Vine, a contemporary of Tim Benjamin at the Royal Northern College of Music from 1994 to 1997. Modelled on the 1960s ensemble The Fires of London, (which in turn was derived from the instrumentation of Schoenberg's Pierrot Lunaire), the core instrumental line-up of Radius is flute, clarinet, violin, cello, piano, and percussion. To this instrumentation have been added trumpet, trombone, French horn, actors, and vocalists, as required for the performance of specific works.

Although Radius is usually unconducted, the ensemble was conducted by John Traill (musician) for performances of Tim Benjamin's The Corley Conspiracy at London's Southbank Centre in September 2007, directed by Sean Starke. Radius has performed at the Purcell Room at the Southbank Centre in London, the Wigmore Hall in London, and the Holywell Music Room in Oxford.

Performers
Musicians who have performed in Radius:
Violin: Daniel Rowland, Alexander Sitkovetsky, Alexandra Wood
Cello: Oliver Coates
Flute: Jennifer George
Clarinet: Charys Green
Piano: John Reid, Berenika Zakrzewski
Percussion: Adrian Spillett
Trumpet: Huw Morgan
Trombone: Tyler Vahldick
French Horn: Jocelyn Lightfoot
Counter-tenor: Robert Ogden
Actors: Paul Tosio, Jonathan Webb, Angela Myers, Hannah Grainger-Clemson, Alan Bailey, Elise Emmanuelle, Arne Muus

World Premieres
Radius has given the world premieres of the following works:
Ian Vine: underpaintings (2005), Wigmore Hall, London, 20 April 2007
Tim Benjamin: Five Bagatelles (2006), Wigmore Hall, London, 20 April 2007
Tim Benjamin / Sean Starke: The Corley Conspiracy (2007), Southbank Centre, London, 19 September 2007
Ian Vine: X (2007), Wigmore Hall, London, 8 January 2008
Tim Benjamin: Three Portraits (2007), Wigmore Hall, London, 8 January 2008
Laurence Crane: Simon 10 Holt 50 (2007), Wigmore Hall, London, 8 January 2008 †
Anthony Gilbert: ecco Eco (2007), Wigmore Hall, London, 8 January 2008 †
Paul Newland: time quivers (2007), Wigmore Hall, London, 8 January 2008 †
Larry Goves: riviniana (2007), Wigmore Hall, London, 8 January 2008 †
Ian Vine: fifty objects (2007), Wigmore Hall, London, 8 January 2008 †
Tim Benjamin: In Memoriam Tape Recorder (2007), Wigmore Hall, London, 8 January 2008
Ian Vine: Gesso (2008), Southbank Centre, London, 25 May 2008
Tim Benjamin: The Rosenhan Experiment (2008), Southbank Centre, London, 25 May 2008

† These works were performed in celebration of the 50th birthday of British composer Simon Holt.

External links
Official website

Contemporary classical music ensembles
English classical music groups
Chamber music groups
London orchestras
Musical groups established in 2007
2007 in London
2007 establishments in England